Santhosh Mada is an Indian filmmaker who works in Tulu cinema. He has received the notional award for his Tulu Film Jeetige in Tulu Category.

Kaithapram Damodaran Namboothiri is his maternal uncle.

Early life and career
Santhosh was born to Shambhu Nambudiri and Saraswathy. He was born and brought up in Mangalore and had his schooling in Kannada medium. During his childhood, he spent about 10 years at his uncle Kaithapram Damodaran Namboodiri's home.

Santhosh has worked with Jayaraj and Kamal as assistant director. He has also worked with Abhaya Simha, Rosshan Andrrews and Pramod Payyannur.

Santhosh is currently making a Malayalam movie with Indrans, Dileesh Pothan and Murali Gopi.

Filmography

Awards

References

External links
 
 

Malayalam film directors
Living people
Film directors from Kerala
21st-century Indian film directors
Year of birth missing (living people)